Millard Airport  is a public airport seven miles (11 km) southwest of the central business district of Omaha, a city in Douglas County, Nebraska, United States. It is owned and operated by the Omaha Airport Authority, who also owns the main airport of Omaha, Eppley Airfield.

Although most US airports use the same three-letter location identifier for the FAA and IATA, Millard Airport is assigned MLE by the FAA and MIQ by the IATA (which assigned MLE to Malé International Airport on Hulhulé Island in the Malé Atoll of the Maldives).

Facilities and aircraft 
For the 12-month period ending August 16, 2005, the airport had 72,300 aircraft operations, an average of 198 per day: 98% general aviation, 2% air taxi and <1% military. There are 173 aircraft based at this airport: 82% single-engine, 15% multi-engine, 2% helicopter and 1% jet.

References

External links 
Millard Airport at Nebraska Department of Aeronautics

Airports in Nebraska
Buildings and structures in Douglas County, Nebraska
Transportation in Omaha, Nebraska